Rainer is a German surname.

Notable people
People with the Rainer family name include:
Adam Rainer (1899–1950), Austrian dwarf and giant
Alfred Rainer (1987–2008), Austrian Nordic combined skier
Alois Rainer (born 1965), German politician
Arnulf Rainer (born 1929), Austrian painter
Dachine Rainer (1921–2000), British poet and anarchist
Francisc Rainer (1874–1944), Austrian-born Romanian physician
Friedrich Rainer (1903–1947), Austrian National Socialist politician
Gerhard Rainer, Austrian bobsledder
Luise Rainer (1910–2014), German film actress
Margrit Rainer (1914–1982), Swiss actress  
Marie-Luise Rainer, Italian luger 
Niklas Rainer, Swedish alpine skier
Ove Rainer (1925–1987), Swedish politician
Peter Rainer, German violinist
Reinhold Rainer (born 1973), Italian luger
Roland Rainer (1910–2004), Austrian architect
Thom S. Rainer (born 1955), American Christian writer and speaker
Wali Rainer (born 1977), American football player
Yvonne Rainer (born 1934), American choreographer and filmmaker

See also
 Rainer (given name)
 Rainer (disambiguation)

References